Robert Sparrow may refer to:

Robert Sparrow (1741–1822), English landowner and politician, member of parliament for Bedford
Robert Sparrow (died 1528), member of parliament for Winchelsea